Gateway Theatre may refer to:

Gateway Theatre (Chicago), Illinois, United States
Gateway Theatre (Chester), England
Gateway Theatre (Edinburgh), Scotland
Gateway Theatre (Richmond), British Columbia, Canada
Gateway Theatre (Singapore)

See also
 Gateway Theatre of Shopping, a shopping centre north of Durban, South Africa